The Meccano Set is an overhead gantry located above a busy controlled at-grade road intersection located at the boundary between  and  in Sydney, New South Wales, Australia. The intersection is a junction where the Hume Highway, Henry Lawson Drive and Woodville Road intersect.

In December 1962 a large overhead gantry with directional signs and traffic lights, was erected by the Department of Main Roads. It was quickly nicknamed the Meccano Set with reference to the children's construction toy Meccano. At that stage, the intersection was a junction for through traffic between Brisbane and Melbourne. Although this was superseded by the Cumberland Highway in August 1988, it remains an important intersection.

In early 2019, the overhead structure was replaced with a new identical pre-fabricated version and was completed in June 2019.

References

Road interchanges in Australia
Transport infrastructure completed in 1962
1962 establishments in Australia
Hume Highway